Amata interniplaga is a moth of the family Erebidae. It was described by Paul Mabille in 1890. It is found in the Republic of the Congo, the Democratic Republic of the Congo, Gabon and Nigeria.

References

Intern
Moths of Africa
Moths described in 1890